Red giant and similar can mean:
red giant, a stage in evolution of stars
Red Giant (horse), a racehorse
Red Giant Entertainment, a comic book publisher
Red Giant Movies, the production studio of Udhayanidhi Stalin
Red Giant, a 2011 album by Century